Leonard Barry Walters (born 1947), is a male former athlete who competed for England.

Athletics career
He represented England and won a bronze medal in the 4 x 400 metres freestyle relay, at the 1970 British Commonwealth Games in Edinburgh, Scotland.

He also represented Great Britain in the 1971 European Athletics Championships in Helsinki.

References

1947 births
English male sprinters
Commonwealth Games medallists in athletics
Commonwealth Games bronze medallists for England
Athletes (track and field) at the 1970 British Commonwealth Games
Living people
Medallists at the 1970 British Commonwealth Games